Narendra Dua (born 16 October 1939) is an Indian cricketer. He played in 29 first-class matches for Madhya Pradesh from 1963/64 to 1974/75. After his cricket career, he became a divisional chairman for the Madhya Pradesh Cricket Association. His son, Sanjeev, is a former cricket umpire.

See also
 List of Madhya Pradesh cricketers

References

External links
 

1939 births
Living people
Indian cricketers
Madhya Pradesh cricketers
Cricketers from Sargodha